Jumai Khan Azad (5 August 1930 – 29 December 2013) was an Indian poet of Awadhi language from Pratapgarh, Uttar Pradesh, India. He received the Awadhi Academy Award and Lokabandhu Rajnarayan Memorial Award.

Biography 
Azad was born in Gobri village in  Pratapgarh in Uttar Pradesh to father Siddiqui Ahmed and mother Hameeda Bano.

Azad published 21 books of poetry.

He died on 29 December 2013.

See also

 List of Indian poets
 List of people from Pratapgarh
 List of Awadhi-language poets

References

1930 births
2013 deaths
People from Pratapgarh, Uttar Pradesh
20th-century Indian poets
Indian male poets
Poets from Uttar Pradesh
20th-century Indian male writers